Ludwig Christian August Bausch (15 January 1805 in Dresden26 May 1871 in Leipzig) was a German Bogenmacher / bow maker. He became known as the "German Tourte".

Bausch started a dynasty of makers. He studied violin making in Dresden with J.B. Fritsche and eventually set up his own firm in Leipzig. He combined the best elements of French and German styles, and achieved great fame.
He was very much influenced by the late F.X. Tourte model, nevertheless his work is very distinct and personal.
His two sons, Ludwig jun. Bausch (Karl Friedrich Ludwig jun.) (1829-1871)  and Otto Julius Bausch (1841-1874)  produced bows  until 1874.

"From the turn of the century (1900 AD) until now, thousands of cheap bows branded with the Bausch name were exported from Germany and sold throughout the world. Genuine Bausch bows, once plentiful, are now scarce and these vary from commercial grade bows to bows of exceptional beauty." - Kenway Lee 1994 

"Heinrich Knopf and his shop, supplied bows to Ludwig Bausch and Nicolaus Kittel (as there are substantial similarities in some of these bows by Kittel and Bausch)" - Gennady Filimonov

References

Further reading
 Die Geigen und Lautenmacher -  by Lutgendorff, Frankfurt 1922
Encyclopedia of the Violin - Alberto  Bachmann
 
 
 
 VSA 14 #2 1995 Nicolaus Kittel: The Russian Tourte by Kenway Lee 183
 Deutsche Bogenmacher-German Bow Makers  Klaus Grunke, Hans Karl Schmidt, Wolfgang Zunterer 2000
Ludwig Bausch: the German "Tourte"

1805 births
1871 deaths
Bow makers
Businesspeople from Dresden
German luthiers
Bowed string instrument makers